Gobiocypris rarus is a freshwater  species of cyprinid fish endemic to China where it is only found near Jiuxiang in Sichuan province. It is the only species in its genus.

Reproduction 
The minimum age of reproduction is 4 months. Females reproduce during the months of March and November when temperatures are warmer. Gobiocypris rarus can produce a large number of eggs, with a high hatching rate.

References

 

Gobioninae
Monotypic fish genera
Cyprinid fish of Asia
Freshwater fish of China
Fish described in 1983